This is a list of cotton spinning mills, weaving sheds, bleachers and dyers and other textile mills in the Metropolitan Borough of Wigan in Greater Manchester, England. They were in the towns, townships and villages of Ashton-in-Makerfield, Aspull, Astley, Atherton, Bedford, Leigh, Golborne, Haigh Hindley Ince-in-Makerfield, Orrell, Pennington, Leigh, Standish, Tyldesley, Westleigh, Leigh and Wigan which were  historically in Lancashire but are now part of the Metropolitan Borough of Wigan since its creation by the Local Government Act 1972. The textile industry in the Wigan and Leigh areas grew out of a domestic putting-out system particularly fustians. Cotton, imported through the Port of Liverpool became more important in the late-18th century and more so after the advent of the Bridgewater and Leeds and Liverpool Canals and after that the first railways, the Bolton and Leigh and Liverpool and Manchester Railways. Wigan fabric was a stout cloth made from coarse cotton.

The Wigan borough has few fast-flowing streams to provide water power and consequently there were few factories until steam power became available. In the 19th century, textile mills on the Lancashire Coalfield were powered by cheap easily accessible coal. In 1818 Wigan had eight mills in the Wallgate area and it developed as a cotton town in Victorian times. From 1889 until the First World War the largest ring spinning company in Britain was Farington, Eckersley & Co of Western and Swan Meadow Mills.

After 1827 a silk industry grew in the Leigh parish and silk fabrics were woven on domestic hand looms and in weaving sheds using silk yarn supplied from Macclesfield or Leek by agents from Manchester. In the mid-19th century silk weaving employed a significant number of people. Domestic weavers travelled from the surrounding townships to and from the agents' warehouses in Leigh. At its peak in 1830 about 10,000 people, mostly domestic, were employed in silk weaving in the parish, after which the numbers declined to 8,000 in 1841 and 2,301 in 1871. By 1836 the town had 20 silk firms, 15 in 1848, five by 1876 and two in 1897. Powered weaving was introduced from the 1850s reducing the number of domestic weavers required. Some manufacturers employed weavers in their homes and in weaving sheds. Bickham and Pownall owners of Stanley Mill employed 1,000 workers of which 500–600 worked in the mill and the rest in their homes. There were nine silk weaving sheds in 1870 but most were converted as cotton took over. In 1891 Samuel Brown at Brook Mill, George Griffin on Brewery Lane and Charles Hilton and Son in Charles Street, all in Bedford were manufacturing silk fabrics.

In 1911 in Leigh, 6,146 people were employed in the cotton industry and from 1913, measured by the number of spindles, it was the fifth-largest spinning centre in Greater Manchester. Cotton weaving was concentrated at Kirkhall Lane Mills built in 1836 and at Jones Brothers Bedford New Mills started in 1834 which developed into an integrated mill for spinning and weaving. In the early-20th century three large weaving sheds were constructed at Foundry Street, Elizabeth Street and Etherstone Street. For cotton spinning, multi-storey mills with massive floor areas were developed. In Westleigh, the Victoria Mills (Hayes Mills) off Kirkhall Lane were built from 1856 by James and John Hayes who had three mills by 1887. By 1902 Tunnicliffe and Hampson had built the three Firs Mills. Two clusters of mills were built in Bedford, along the Bedford Brook and in the 20th century, near the Bridgewater Canal. The design of the surviving late-19th and early 20th-century factories along the Bridgewater Canal in Bedford is an example of the peak of the Lancashire mill-building tradition. Combined Egyptian Mills, a joint-stock company formed in 1929 with headquarters at Howe Bridge Mills in Atherton, was the second largest cotton-spinning company in the world with 34 mills and 3.2 million spindles.

Ashton in Makerfield

Aspull

Astley

Atherton

Bedford, Leigh

Golborne

Haigh

Hindley

Ince

Orrell

Pemberton

Pennington

Standish

Tyldesley

Westleigh

Wigan

See also
 List of mills owned by the Lancashire Cotton Corporation Limited
 Fine Spinners and Doublers

References

Citations

Bibliography

External links

Aerial view of Laburnum Mills, Atherton.
Aerial view of Dan Lane Mills, Atherton
Aerial view of Trencherfield Mill
Aerial view of Gidlow Works
 Aerial view of Courtaulds' Bedford New Mills

 
Wigan
Wigan